Westfield Schools may refer to:
 The Westfield School, a private PK-12 school in Perry, Georgia, United States.
 Westfield Public Schools, a public school district in Union County, New Jersey, United States.

See also
 Westfield Schools (disambiguation)
 Westfield High School (disambiguation)